Lisa Lichtfus (born 28 December 1999) is an association football player from Belgium. She was playing for the Dijon team in 2022 and she was in the Belgium women's national football team.

Life
Lichtfus was born in the village of Aye in Wallonia in 1999. Lichtfus became a medical student in the University of Liège.

She signed with Dijon FCO in June 2021.

She was included in the 2022 Pinatar Cup squads.

In May 2022 she was one of three goalkeepers included in the Belgium women's team.

The other two goalkeepers in the national team in 2022 are Nicky Evrard who plays for Gent and Diede Lemey who plays for Sassuolo.

References

1999 births
Living people
People from Marche-en-Famenne
Women's association football goalkeepers
Belgian women's footballers
Belgium women's youth international footballers
Dijon FCO (women) players
Standard Liège (women) players